Jaime Bendeck (born 21 November 1996) is a Honduran tennis player.

Bendeck has a career high ATP singles ranking of 1580 achieved on 30 April 2018. He also has a career high ATP doubles ranking of 571 achieved on 10 February 2020.

Bendeck represents Honduras at the Davis Cup, where he has a W/L record of 10–6.

Bendeck played college tennis at Baylor.

World Tennis Tour and Challenger finals

Doubles: 2 (1–1)

Davis Cup

Participations: (10–6)

   indicates the outcome of the Davis Cup match followed by the score, date, place of event, the zonal classification and its phase, and the court surface.

References

External links

1996 births
Living people
Baylor Bears men's tennis players
Sportspeople from Valencia
Sportspeople from Hollywood, Florida
American male tennis players
Honduran male tennis players